Ottaviano Capece (died 1616) was a Roman Catholic prelate who served as Bishop of Nicotera (1582–1616).

Biography
On 21 May 1582, Ottaviano Capece was appointed during the papacy of Pope Gregory XIII as Bishop of Nicotera.
He served as Bishop of Nicotera until his death in 1616.

References 

16th-century Italian Roman Catholic bishops
17th-century Italian Roman Catholic bishops
Bishops appointed by Pope Gregory XIII
1616 deaths